Bay FM (call sign: 2BAY) is a community radio station serving the Byron Shire and beyond from Byron Bay, New South Wales, Australia.

Totally volunteer run, Bay FM aims to provide independent community-responsive radio informing and entertaining locally and globally.

Locally, the station's frequency is 99.9 MHz and it covers the Northern Rivers region of New South Wales.

Bay FM, in the late 1990s, spawned the broadcasting of Byron's "Top 3 DJs", Soopa Kleen, GeeDay Jack Doff and Fresh Baby, each of whom made acclaimed appearances on a variety of Bay FM programs in the days of the "old building".

Within the group of presenters responsible, Bay FM experienced its first broadcasts using digital devices and equipment, originally and plugged straight into the desk via the hidden RCA connectors.

The "Knights Of Bullthingy"DJ Michael Kenyon, The Milkshake Brothers, Grant Kenyon and Guano Thrustwere regulars during this period and remain active in their careers.

External links
Bay FM website
Bay FM comedy show website

Community radio stations in Australia
Radio stations in New South Wales
Byron Bay, New South Wales